Thriller is the third EP released by South Korean boy band, BTOB. It was released on September 9, 2013, consisting a total of 6 tracks with Thriller as title track and the promotional single of the album.

Background
On August 23, 2013, Cube Entertainment released concept pictures for "When I Was Your Man", a pre-release track from the album before the official release with a special music video for the song released a few days later. On September 4, 2013, BTOB uploaded the music video of Thriller on their official YouTube channel and on the same day they performed Thriller and When I Was Your Man on MBC's Show Champion prior to the release date of the EP.

Composition
The EP features a total of 6 tracks with 5 tracks co-written by the members of BTOB themselves and the third track of the EP titled 왜이래 (Why) was composed and co-written by label mate Beast's Lee Gi-kwang.

The EP opens with the first track When I Was Your Man, a classy and soft, laid back track. The song is about a man looking back at a past relationship, and reflecting how different he is now. The second track of the album, Thriller, a dynamic song with a story of a fallen knight coming back to life to finish their mission of saving their princess. It is a song that focuses on that rush they get as they rise from the grave. The third track Why is an R&B influenced track that tells the story of a man who has realized that his lover has no feelings left for him. The fourth track Catch Me is a song that is focused on the feelings one experiences that moment he falls in love. The fifth track Like a Crystal, is a song largely accompanied by an acoustic guitar and the last track Star is a ballad song that samples the bars of the famous nursery rhyme, “Twinkle Twinkle Little Star".

Track listing
※ Track in bold is the title track in the album.

Charts

Release history

 Release date for worldwide may vary in different countries

References

External links

Cube Entertainment EPs
Dance-pop EPs
2013 EPs
BtoB (band) EPs
Korean-language EPs